The 2002–03 Lithuanian Hockey League season was the 12th season of the Lithuanian Hockey League, the top level of ice hockey in Lithuania. 13 teams participated in the league, and SC Energija won the championship. SC Energija received a bye until the finals, as they played in the Eastern European Hockey League.

Regular season

Group A

Group B

Group C

Final 
 SC Energija - Garsu Pasaulis Vilnius 10:2/11:2

External links

Lithuanian Hockey League
Lithuania Hockey League seasons
Lith